Anticlea volcanica  is a herbaceous perennial plant belonging to the family Melanthiaceae natively occurring from central Mexico to Guatemala.

References

Melanthiaceae
Flora of Mexico
Flora of Guatemala